is a 1997 role-playing video game developed by Square for the PlayStation console. It is the seventh main installment in the Final Fantasy series. Published in Japan by Square, it was released in other regions by Sony Computer Entertainment and is the first in the main series with a PAL release. The game's story follows Cloud Strife, a mercenary who joins an eco-terrorist organization to stop a world-controlling megacorporation from using the planet's life essence as an energy source. Events send Cloud and his allies in pursuit of Sephiroth, a former member of the corporation who seeks to destroy the planet. During the journey, Cloud builds close friendships with his party members, including Aerith Gainsborough, who holds the secret to saving their world.

Development began in 1994, originally for the Super Famicom. After delays and technical difficulties from experimenting on several real-time rendering platforms, Square moved production to pre-rendered video, necessitating the huge capacity of the  format and therefore departing Nintendo for the PlayStation. Veteran Final Fantasy staff returned, including series creator and producer Hironobu Sakaguchi, director Yoshinori Kitase, and composer Nobuo Uematsu. The game is the first in the series to use full motion video and 3D computer graphics, superimposing real-time 3D character models over pre-rendered CGI backgrounds. Final Fantasy VII introduced more widespread science fiction elements and a more realistic presentation, while the gameplay systems remained largely similar to previous entries, with the addition of new elements such as Materia, Limit Breaks, and new minigames.

Assisted by a large promotional campaign, Final Fantasy VII was a commercial success and received universal acclaim, selling more than  copies worldwide. It is regarded as a landmark game and as one of the greatest and most influential video games ever made. It won numerous Game of the Year awards, and was acknowledged for boosting sales of the PlayStation and popularizing console role-playing games worldwide. Critics praised its graphics, gameplay, music, and story, although its original English localization received criticism. Its success has led to enhanced ports on various platforms, a multimedia sub-series called the Compilation of Final Fantasy VII, and the ongoing multipart high-definition Final Fantasy VII Remake, the first installment of which was released in 2020.

Gameplay

The gameplay of Final Fantasy VII is mostly comparable to earlier Final Fantasy games and Japanese role-playing games. The game features three modes of play: the world map, the field, and the battle screen. At its grandest scale, players explore the entire world of Final Fantasy VII on a 3D world map. The world map is littered with representations of areas for the player to enter, including towns, environments, and ruins. Natural barriers—such as mountains, deserts, and bodies of water—block access by foot to some areas; as the game progresses, the player receives vehicles that help traverse these obstacles. Chocobos can be found in certain spots on the map, and if caught, can be ridden to areas inaccessible by foot or vehicle. In field mode, the player navigates fully scaled versions of the areas represented on the world map. For the first time in the series, this mode is represented in three-dimensional space. The player can explore the environment, talk with characters, advance the story, and initiate event games in this mode. Event games are short minigames that use special control functions and are often tied into the story. While in field mode, the player may also find shops and inns. Shops provide an opportunity to buy and sell items that can aid Cloud and his party, such as weapons, armor, and accessories. If the characters rest at an inn, their hit points and mana points will be restored, along with any abnormalities contracted during battles.

At random intervals on the world map and in field mode, and at specific moments in the story, the game will enter the battle screen. This screen places the player characters on one side, the enemies on the other, and employs an "Active Time Battle" (ATB) system in which the characters exchange moves until one side is defeated. The damage (or healing) dealt by either side is quantified on screen. Characters have many statistics that determine their effectiveness in battle; for example, hit points determine how much damage they can take, and magic determines how much damage they can inflict with spells. Each character on the screen has a time gauge; when a character's gauge is full, the player can input a command for that character. The commands change as the game progresses, and are dependent on the characters in the player's party and their equipment. Commands may include attacking with a weapon, casting magic, using items, summoning monsters, and other actions that either damage the enemy or aid the player characters. Final Fantasy VII also features powerful, character-specific commands called Limit Breaks, which can be used only after a special gauge is charged by enemy attacks. After being attacked, characters may be afflicted by one or more abnormal "statuses", such as poison or paralysis. These statuses and their adverse effects can be removed by special items or abilities. When all the enemies are defeated, the battle ends and the player may be rewarded with money, items, and experience points. If the player is defeated, it is game over and the game must be restored to the last save point.

When not in battle, the player can use the menu screen. On this screen, the player can review each character's status and statistics, use items and abilities, change equipment, save the game (when on the world map or at a save point), and manage orbs called Materia. The main method of customizing characters in Final Fantasy VII, Materia may be added to equipment to provide characters with new magic spells, monsters to summon, commands, statistical upgrades, and other benefits. Materia levels up with their own experience point system and can be combined to create different effects.

Plot

Setting and characters

Final Fantasy VII takes place on a world referred to in-game as the "Planet", though it has been retroactively named "Gaia". The planet's lifeforce, called the Lifestream, is a flow of spiritual energy that gives life to everything on the Planet. Its processed form is known as "Mako". On a societal and technological level, the game has been defined as an industrial or post-industrial science fiction milieu. During Final Fantasy VII, the Planet's Lifestream is being drained for energy by the Shinra Electric Power Company (神羅), a world-dominating megacorporation headquartered in the city of Midgar. Shinra's actions are weakening the Planet, threatening its existence and all life. Significant factions within the game include AVALANCHE, an eco-terrorist group seeking Shinra's downfall so the Planet can recover; the Turks, a covert branch of Shinra's security forces; SOLDIER, an elite Shinra fighting force created by enhancing humans with Mako; and the Cetra, also known as the Ancients, a near-extinct human tribe which maintains a strong connection to the Planet and the Lifestream.

The central protagonist is Cloud Strife, an unsociable mercenary who claims to be a former 1st Class SOLDIER. Early on, he works with two members of AVALANCHE: Barret Wallace, its brazen but fatherly leader; and Tifa Lockhart, a shy yet nurturing martial artist and childhood friend of Cloud. On their journey, they meet Aerith Gainsborough, a carefree flower merchant and one of the last surviving Cetra; Red XIII, an intelligent quadruped from a tribe that protects the planet; Cait Sith, a fortune-telling robotic cat controlled by repentant Shinra staff member Reeve; and Cid Highwind, a pilot whose dream of being the first human in outer space was not realized. The group can also recruit Yuffie Kisaragi, a young ninja and skilled Materia thief; and Vincent Valentine, a former Turk, and victim of Shinra experiments. The game's main antagonists are Rufus Shinra, son of President Shinra and later leader of the Shinra Corporation; Sephiroth, a former SOLDIER who reappears several years after he was thought dead and seeks to harm the planet and become a god himself; and Jenova, a hostile extraterrestrial life-form imprisoned by the Cetra 2000 years before.  A key character in Cloud's backstory is Zack Fair, a member of SOLDIER and Aerith's first love.

Story
AVALANCHE destroys a Shinra Mako reactor in Midgar; an attack on another reactor goes wrong, and Cloud falls into the city slums. There, he meets Aerith and protects her from Shinra. Meanwhile, Shinra finds AVALANCHE and collapses part of the upper city, killing most of AVALANCHE along with the slum population below. Aerith is also captured; as a Cetra, she can potentially reveal the "Promised Land", which Shinra believes is overflowing with exploitable Lifestream energy. Cloud, Barret, and Tifa rescue Aerith; during their escape from Midgar, they discover that Rufus' father has been murdered by Sephiroth, who was presumed dead five years earlier. The party pursues Sephiroth across the Planet, with now-President Rufus on their trail.

The group begins to encounter Sephiroth during their journey, who continuously appears and disappears after taunting Cloud and sending Jenova-esque monsters after him. Finding him at a Cetra temple, Sephiroth reveals his intentions to use the Black Materia to summon "Meteor", a spell that will hit the Planet with a devastating impact. Sephiroth will absorb the Lifestream as it attempts to heal the wound, becoming a god-like being. The party retrieves the Black Materia, but Sephiroth manipulates Cloud into surrendering it. Aerith departs alone to stop Sephiroth, following him to an abandoned Cetra city. During Aerith's prayer to the Planet for help, Sephiroth attempts to force Cloud to kill her; failing, he kills her himself before fleeing, angering Cloud. The party then learns that Jenova is not a Cetra as once thought. Rather, it is a hostile alien lifeform whose remains were unearthed by Shinra scientists decades earlier; at Nibelheim, Jenova's cells were used to create Sephiroth.

At the Northern Crater, the party learns that the "Sephiroths" they have encountered are Jenova clones created by the insane Shinra scientist Hojo. The party confront one particular Jenova clone as it is killing other clones to reunite Jenova's cells. After it is defeated it drops the Black Materia, but Cloud is again manipulated into delivering it to the real Sephiroth. Sephiroth then taunts Cloud by showing another SOLDIER in Cloud's place in his memories of Nibelheim, suggesting that Cloud is a failed Sephiroth clone. Sephiroth summons Meteor and seals the Crater with a magical barrier; Cloud falls into the Lifestream, the party is captured by Rufus, and several giant monsters known as Weapons emerge to defend the planet from harm.

Escaping Shinra, the party discovers Cloud at an island hospital in a catatonic state from Mako poisoning; Tifa stays as his caretaker. When the island is attacked by a Weapon, the two fall into the Lifestream, where Tifa helps Cloud reconstruct his memories: a shy child during his time in Nibelheim, Cloud was blamed when a young Tifa injured herself trying to cross Mt. Nibel. Resolving to become stronger, Cloud leaves for Midgar to join SOLDIER but was never accepted into the organization; the SOLDIER in his memories was his friend Zack. At Nibelheim, Cloud surprised and wounded Sephiroth after the latter's mental breakdown, but Jenova preserved Sephiroth's life. Hojo experimented on Cloud and Zack for four years, injecting them with Jenova's cells and Mako; they escaped, but Zack did not survive. The combined trauma of these events triggered an identity crisis in Cloud; he constructed a false persona around Zack's stories and his own fantasies. Cloud accepts his past and reunites with the party, who learn that Aerith's prayer to the Planet had been successful: the Planet had attempted to summon Holy to prevent Meteor's impact, but is undermined by Sephiroth.

Shinra fails to destroy Meteor but manages to defeat a Weapon and puncture Sephiroth's barrier around the Northern Crater with its Mako-powered superweapon, the Sister Ray. Hojo attempts to commandeer the superweapon to aid Sephiroth and reveals himself to be Sephiroth's biological father before he is slain by Cloud's party. The party descends to the Planet's core through the opening in the Northern Crater and defeats both Jenova and Sephiroth. The party escapes and Holy is summoned, which destroys Meteor with the help of the Lifestream. Five hundred years later, Red XIII is seen with two cubs looking out over the ruins of Midgar, which are now covered in greenery, showing the planet has healed.

Development

Initial concept talks for Final Fantasy VII began in 1994 at Final Fantasy developer Square, following the completion of Final Fantasy VI. As with the previous installment, series creator Hironobu Sakaguchi reduced his role to producer and granted others a more active role in development: these included Yoshinori Kitase, one of the directors of Final Fantasy VI. The next installment was planned as a 2D game for the Super NES. After creating an early 2D prototype of it, the team postponed development to help finish Chrono Trigger for Super NES. The team resumed discussions for Final Fantasy VII in 1995.

The team discussed continuing the 2D strategy, which would have been the safe and immediate path compared to the radically new development paradigm behind the industry's imminent shift toward 3D gaming. The team took the riskier option to make a 3D game on new generation hardware, with their main choices being the cartridge-based Nintendo 64 or the CD-ROM-based Sony PlayStation. The team also considered the Sega Saturn console and Windows. Their decision was influenced by two factors: a widely successful technology demo based on Final Fantasy VI using the new Softimage 3D software, and the escalating price of cartridges which had already limited Square's audience. Tests were made for a Nintendo 64 version, which would use the planned 64DD floppy drive peripheral though Nintendo had not yet produced 64DD development kits due to the prototype's changing hardware specifications. This real-time version was discarded during early testing, as the Behemoth monster's 2000 polygons placed excessive strain on the Nintendo 64, causing a low frame rate. It would have required an estimated thirty 64DD disks at about  each to run Final Fantasy VII properly with the data compression methods of the day. Faced with the state of technology, and impressed by the increased storage capacity of CD-ROM when compared to the Nintendo 64 cartridge, Square shifted development of Final Fantasy VII and all other planned projects, onto the PlayStation with pre-rendered movies.

In contrast to the visuals and audio, the overall gameplay system remained mostly unchanged from Final Fantasy V and VI, but with a researched emphasis on player control. The initial decision was for battles to feature shifting camera angles. Battle arenas had a lower polygon count than field areas, which made creating distinctive features more difficult. The summon sequences benefited strongly from the switch to the cinematic style, as the team had struggled to portray their scale using 2D graphics. In his role as producer, Sakaguchi placed much of his effort into developing the battle system. He proposed the Materia system to provide more character customization than previous Final Fantasy games. Battles no longer revolved around characters with innate skills and roles in battle, because Materia could be reconfigured between battles. Artist Tetsuya Nomura contributed to the gameplay by designing the Limit Break system as an evolution of the Desperation Attacks from Final Fantasy VI. The Limit Breaks serve a purpose in gameplay while also evoking each character's personality in battle.

Square's developers retained the passion-based game development approach from their earlier projects, but now had the resources and ambition to create the game they wanted. This was because they had extensive capital from their earlier commercial successes, which meant they could focus on quality and scale rather than obsessing over and working around their budget. Development of the final version took a staff of between 100 and 150 people just over a year to complete. As video game development teams were usually only 20 people, the game had what was described as the largest development team of any game up to that point. The development team was split between both Square's Japanese offices and its new American office in Los Angeles; the American team worked primarily on city backgrounds.

Art design

The game's art director was Yusuke Naora, who had previously worked as a designer for Final Fantasy VI. With the switch into 3D, Naora realized that he needed to relearn drawing, as 3D visuals require a very different approach than 2D. With the massive scale and scope of the project, Naora was granted a team devoted entirely to the game's visual design. The department's duties included illustration, modeling of 3D characters, texturing, the creation of environments, visual effects, and animation. Naora later defined the art style of Final Fantasy VII as "dark" and "weird". The Shinra logo, which incorporates a kanji symbol, was drawn by Naora personally. Promotional artwork and the logo artwork were created by Yoshitaka Amano, an artist whose association with the series went back to its inception. Though he had taken a prominent role in earlier entries, Amano was unable to do so for Final Fantasy VII, due to commitments at overseas exhibitions. His logo artwork was based on Meteor, though he was initially not sure how to turn it into suitable artwork. He finally created multiple variations of the image and solicited the staff members' preferences. The green coloring represents the predominant lighting in Midgar and the color of the Lifestream, while the blue reflected the ecological themes present in the story. Its coloring directly influenced the general coloring of the game's environments.

Another prominent artist was Nomura. Having impressed Sakaguchi with his proposed ideas, which were handwritten and illustrated rather than simply typed on a PC, Nomura was brought on as main character designer. Nomura stated that when he was brought on, the main scenario had not been completed, but he "went along like, 'I guess first off you need a hero and a heroine', and from there drew the designs while thinking up details about the characters. After [he'd] done the hero and heroine, [he] carried on drawing by thinking what kind of characters would be interesting to have. When [he] handed over the designs [he'd] tell people the character details [he'd] thought up, or write them down on a separate sheet of paper". The chibi sprite art could not be carried over from earlier games, as that would not fit with the new graphical direction. Naora, in his role as an assistant character designer and art director, helped adjust each character's appearance so the actions they performed were believable. When designing Cloud and Sephiroth, Nomura was influenced by his view of their rivalry mirroring the legendary animosity between Miyamoto Musashi and Sasaki Kojirō, with Cloud and Sephiroth being Musashi and Kojirō respectively. Sephiroth's look was defined as "kakkoii", a Japanese term combining good looks with coolness. Several of Nomura's designs evolved substantially during development. Cloud's original design of slicked-back black hair with no spikes was intended to reduce polygon count and contrast with Sephiroth's long, flowing silver hair. However, Nomura feared that such masculinity could prove unpopular with fans, so he redesigned Cloud to feature a shock of spiky, bright blond hair. Vincent's occupation changed from researcher to detective to chemist, and finally to a former Turk with a tragic past.

Scenario
Sakaguchi was responsible for writing the initial plot, which was substantially different from the final version. In this draft for the planned Super NES version, the game's setting was envisioned as New York City in 1999. Similar to the final story, the main characters were part of an organization trying to destroy Mako reactors, but they were pursued by a hot-blooded detective named Joe. The main characters would eventually blow up the city. An early version of the Lifestream concept was present at this stage. According to Sakaguchi, his mother had died while Final Fantasy III was being developed, and choosing life as a theme helped him cope with her passing in a rational and analytical manner. Square eventually used the New York setting in Parasite Eve (1998). While the planned concept was dropped, Final Fantasy VII still marked a drastic shift in setting from previous entries, dropping the Medieval fantasy elements in favor of a world that was "ambiguously futuristic".

When Kitase was put in charge of Final Fantasy VII, he and Nomura reworked the entire initial plot. Scenario writer Kazushige Nojima joined the team after finishing work on Bahamut Lagoon. While Final Fantasy VI featured an ensemble cast of numerous playable characters that were equally important, the team soon decided to develop a central protagonist for Final Fantasy VII. The pursuit of Sephiroth that comprised most of the main narrative was suggested by Nomura, as nothing similar had been done in the series before. Kitase and Nojima conceived AVALANCHE and Shinra as opposing organizations and created Cloud's backstory as well as his relationship to Sephiroth. Among Nojima's biggest contributions to the plot were Cloud's memories and split personality; this included the eventual conclusion involving his newly created character of Zack. The crew helped Kitase adjust the specifics of Sakaguchi's original Lifestream concept.

Regarding the overall theme of the game, Sakaguchi said it was "not enough to make 'life' the theme, you need to depict living and dying. In any event, you need to portray death". Consequently, Nomura proposed killing off the heroine. Aerith had been the only heroine, but the death of a female protagonist would necessitate a second; this led to the creation of Tifa. The developers decided to kill Aerith, as her death would be the most devastating and consequential. Kitase wanted to depict it as very sudden and unexpected, leaving "not a dramatic feeling but great emptiness", "feelings of reality and not Hollywood". The script for the scene was written by Nojima. Kitase and Nojima then planned that most of the main cast would die shortly before the final battle, but Nomura vetoed the idea because he thought it would undermine the impact of Aerith's death. Several character relations and statuses underwent changes during development. Aerith was to be Sephiroth's sister, which influenced the design of her hair. The team then made Sephiroth a previous love interest of hers to deepen her backstory, but later swapped him with Zack. Vincent and Yuffie were to be part of the main narrative, but due to time constraints, they were nearly cut and eventually relegated to being optional characters.

Nojima was charged with writing the scenario and unifying the team's ideas into a cohesive narrative, as Kitase was impressed with his earlier work on the mystery-like Heracles no Eikō III: Kamigami no Chinmoku, an entry in the Glory of Heracles series. To make the characters more realistic, Nojima wrote scenes in which they would occasionally argue and raise objections. Though this inevitably slowed down the pace of the story, it added depth to the characters. The graphical improvements allowed even relatively bland lines of dialogue to be enhanced with reactions and poses from the 3D character models. Voice acting would have led to significant load times, so it was omitted. A fan-made mod eventually added full voice acting to the game in 2023. Masato Kato wrote several late-game scenes, including the Lifestream sequence and Cloud and Tifa's conversation before the final battle. Initially unaffiliated with the project, Kato was called on to help flesh out some story scenes. Like each of the individual scenario writers, Kato, after thoroughly discussing the story with the entire project team, wrote his own scenes according to his tastes that were later approved after verifying that they were up to standards.

Graphics
With the shift from the Super NES to the next generation consoles, Final Fantasy VII became the first project in the series to use 3D computer graphics. Aside from the story, Final Fantasy VI had many details undecided when development began and most design elements were hashed out along the way. In contrast, with Final Fantasy VII, the developers knew from the outset it was going to be "a real 3D game", so from the earliest planning stage, detailed designs were in existence. The script was also finalized, and the image for the graphics had been fleshed out. This meant that when actual development work began, storyboards for the game were already in place. The shift from cartridge ROM to CD-ROM posed some problems: according to lead programmer Ken Narita, the CD-ROM had a slower access speed, delaying some actions during the game, so the team needed to overcome this issue. Certain tricks were used to conceal load times, such as offering animations to keep players from getting bored. When it was decided to use 3D graphics, there was a discussion among the staff whether to use sprite-based character models or 3D polygonal models. While sprites proved more popular with the staff, the polygon models were chosen as they could better express emotion. This decision was influenced by the team's exposure to the 3D character models used in Alone in the Dark. Sakaguchi decided to use deformed models for field navigation and real-time event scenes, for better expression of emotion, while realistically proportioned models would be used in battles. The team purchased Silicon Graphics Onyx supercomputers and related workstations, and accompanying software including Softimage 3D, PowerAnimator, and N-World for an estimated total of $21 million. Many team members had never seen 3D development technology before.

The transition from 2D graphics to 3D environments overlaid on pre-rendered backgrounds was accompanied by a focus on a more realistic presentation. In previous entries, the sizes for characters and environments are fixed, and the player has a scrolling perspective. This changed with Final Fantasy VII, in which environments shift with camera angles, and character model sizes shift depending on both their place in the environment and their distance from the camera, giving a sense of scale. The choice of this highly cinematic style of storytelling, contrasting directly with Square's previous games, is attributed to Kitase, who was a fan of films and had an interest in the parallels between film and video game narrative. Character movement during in-game events was done by the character designers in the planning group. Designers normally cooperate with a motion specialist for such animations, but these taught themselves motion work, resulting in each character's movements differing depending on their creators—some designers liked exaggerated movements, and others went for subtlety. Much of the time was spent on each character's day-to-day, routine animations. Motion specialists were brought in for the game's battle animations. The first characters the team worked with were Cloud and Barret. Some of the real-time effects, such as an explosion near the opening, were hand-drawn rather than computer animated.

The main creative force behind the overall 3D presentation was Kazuyuki Hashimoto, the general supervisor for these sequences. Being experienced in the new technology the team had brought on board, he accepted the post at Square as the team aligned with his own creative spirit. One of the major events in development was when the real-time graphics were synchronized to computer-generated full motion video (FMV) cutscenes for some story sequences, including an early sequence where a real-time model of Cloud jumps onto an FMV-rendered moving train. The backgrounds were created by overlaying two 2D graphic layers and changing the motion speed of each to simulate depth perception. While this was not a new technique, the increased power of the PlayStation enabled a more elaborate version of this effect. The biggest issue with the 3D graphics was the large memory storage gap between the development hardware and the console: while the early 3D tech demo had been developed on a machine with over 400 megabytes of total memory, the PlayStation only had two megabytes of system memory and 500 kilobytes for texture memory. The team needed to figure out how to shrink the amount of data while preserving the desired effects. This was aided with reluctant help from Sony, who had hoped to keep Square's direct involvement limited to a standard API package, but they eventually relented and allowed the team direct access to the hardware specifications.

Final Fantasy VII features two types of cutscenes: real-time cutscenes featuring polygon models on pre-rendered backgrounds, and computer-generated imagery (CGI) FMV cutscenes. The FMVs were created by an international team, covering both Japan and North America and involving talent from the gaming and film industry; Western contributors included artists and staff who had worked on the Star Wars film series, Jurassic Park, Terminator 2: Judgment Day, and True Lies. The team tried to create additional optional CGI content which would bring optional characters Vincent and Yuffie into the ending. As this would have further increased the number of discs the game needed, the idea was discarded. Kazuyuki Ikumori, a future key figure at the 1999-founded CGI studio Square Visual Works, helped with the creation of the CGI cutscenes, in addition to general background design. The CGI FMV sequences total around 40 minutes of footage, something only possible with the PlayStation's extra memory space and graphical power. This innovation brought with it the added difficulty of ensuring that the inferiority of the in-game graphics in comparison to the FMV sequences was not too obvious. Kitase has described the process of making the in-game environments as detailed as possible to be "a daunting task".

Music

The musical score of Final Fantasy VII was composed, arranged, and produced by Nobuo Uematsu, who had served as the sole composer for the six previous Final Fantasy games. Originally, Uematsu had planned to use CD quality music with vocal performances to take advantage of the console's audio capabilities but found that it resulted in the game having much longer loading times for each area. Uematsu then decided that the higher quality audio was not worth the trade-off with performance, and opted instead to use MIDI-like sounds produced by the console's internal sound sequencer, similar to how his soundtracks for the previous games in the series on the Super NES were implemented. The Super NES only has eight sound channels to work with, and the PlayStation has twenty-four. Eight are reserved for sound effects, leaving sixteen available for the music. Uematsu's approach to composing the game's music was to treat it like a film soundtrack and compose music that reflected the mood of the scenes, rather than trying to make strong melodies to "define the game", as he said that approach would be too strong when placed alongside the game's new 3D visuals. As an example, he composed the track intended for the scene in the game where Aerith Gainsborough is killed to be "sad but beautiful", rather than more overtly emotional, creating a more understated feeling. Uematsu additionally said that the soundtrack had a feel of "realism", which also prevented him from using "exorbitant, crazy music".

The first piece that Uematsu composed for the game was the opening theme; game director Yoshinori Kitase showed him the opening cinematic and asked him to begin the project there. The track was well received in the company, which gave Uematsu "a sense that it was going to be a really good project". Final Fantasy VII was the first game in the series to include a track with high-quality digitized vocals, "One-Winged Angel", which accompanies a section of the final battle of the game. The track has been called Uematsu's "most recognizable contribution" to the music of the Final Fantasy series, which Uematsu agrees with. Inspired by The Rite of Spring by Igor Stravinsky to make a more "classical" track, and by rock and roll music from the late 1960s and early 1970s to make an orchestral track with a "destructive impact", he spent two weeks composing short unconnected musical phrases, and then arranged them together into "One-Winged Angel", an approach he had never used before.

Music from the game has been released in several albums. Square released the main soundtrack album, Final Fantasy VII Original Soundtrack, on four Compact Discs through its DigiCube subsidiary in 1997. A limited edition release was also produced, containing illustrated liner notes. The regular edition of the album reached third on the Japan Oricon charts, while the limited edition reached #19. Overall, the album had sold nearly 150,000 copies by January 2010. A single-disc album of selected tracks from the original soundtrack, along with three arranged pieces, titled Final Fantasy VII Reunion Tracks, was also released by DigiCube in 1997, reaching #20 on the Japan Oricon charts. A third album, Piano Collections Final Fantasy VII, was released by DigiCube in 2003, and contains one disc of piano arrangements of tracks from the game. It was arranged by Shirō Hamaguchi and performed by Seiji Honda, and reached #228 on the Oricon charts. A 40-minute symphony in three movements consisting of music from Final Fantasy VII premiered in 2013 as part of the Final Symphony concert series and was recorded a year later by the London Symphony Orchestra at Abbey Road Studios. Nobuo Uematsu was on site and advised on the production. The album entered the Classical Album Top 5 of both the Billboard Charts and the Official UK Charts.

Release
Final Fantasy VII was announced in February 1996, along with early screenshots of the game. Square president and chief executive officer Tomoyuki Takechi were fairly confident about Japanese players making the game a commercial success even on a new platform. A playable demo was included on a disc giveaway at the 1996 Tokyo Game Show, dubbed Square's Preview Extra: Final Fantasy VII & Siggraph '95 Works. The disc also included the early test footage Square created using characters from Final Fantasy VI. The initial release date was at some point in 1996, but to properly realize their vision, Square postponed the release date almost a full year. A playable demo of Final Fantasy VII was included with Squaresoft's Tobal No. 1 in 1996.

Final Fantasy VII was released on January 31, 1997. It was published in Japan by Square. A re-release of the game based on its Western version, titled Final Fantasy VII International, was released on October 2 the same year. This improved International version would kickstart the trend for Square to create an updated version for the Japanese release, based on the enhanced Western versions. The International version was re-released as a physical disc as part of the Final Fantasy 25th Anniversary Ultimate Box Japanese package on December 18, 2012.

While its success in Japan had been taken for granted by Square executives, North America and Europe were another matter, as up to that time role-playing games were still a niche market in Western territories. Sony, due to the PlayStation's struggles against Nintendo and Sega's home consoles, lobbied for the publishing rights in North America and Europe following Final Fantasy VIIs transfer to PlayStation—to further persuade Square, Sony offered a lucrative royalties deal with profits potentially equaling those Square would get by self-publishing the game. Square accepted Sony's offer as Square itself lacked Western publishing experience. Square was uncertain about the game's success, as other Japanese RPGs including Final Fantasy VI had met with poor sales outside Japan. To help with promoting the game overseas, Square dissolved their original Washington offices and hired new staff for fresh offices in Costa Mesa. It was first exhibited to the Western public at E3 1996.

To promote the game overseas, Square and Sony launched a widespread three-month advertising campaign in August 1997. Beginning with a television commercial by TBWA\Chiat\Day that ran alongside popular shows including Saturday Night Live, The Simpsons, Late Night with Conan O'Brien, and Prime Time Sports, the campaign included numerous articles in both gaming and general interest magazines, advertisements in comics from publishers such as DC Comics and Marvel, a special collaboration with Pepsi, media events, sample discs, and merchandise. Unlike its predecessors, Final Fantasy VII did not have its numeral adjusted to account for the lack of a Western release for Final Fantasy II, III, and V — while only the fourth Final Fantasy was released outside Japan, its Japanese title was retained. It was released in North America on September 7, 1997. The game was released in the United Kingdom on November 14, and in continental Europe on November 17, becoming the first main-line Final Fantasy game to be released in Europe. The Western version included additional elements and alterations, such as streamlining of the menu and Materia system, reducing the health of enemies, new visual cues to help with navigation across the world map, and additional cutscenes relating to Cloud's past.

PC version
Square developed a PC port, to maximize the player base. Many Western consumers did not own a PlayStation, and Square's deal with Sony did not prohibit such a port. Having never released a PC game, Square treated it as a sales experiment. The port was handled by a team of 15 to 20 people, mostly from Costa Mesa and with help from Tokyo, after the console version was finished. Square was hiring staff to develop the PC version from early 1997, including job adverts published in video game magazines at the time, and by the time Square signed a publishing deal for the PC version at the end of 1997, the Costa Mesa group had already been working on it for seven months.

The team needed to rewrite an estimated 80% of the game's code, due to the need to unify what had been a custom build for a console written by multiple staff members. Consequently, programmers faced problems such as having to unify the original PlayStation version's five different game engines, leading to delays. The PC version came with a license for Yamaha Corporation's software synthesizer S-YXG70, uniformly delivering high-quality sequenced music to a chaotic hardware market. The conversion of the nearly 100 original musical pieces to XG format files was done by Yamaha.

To maximize chances of success, Square searched for a Western company to assist with releasing the PC version. Eidos Interactive, whose release of Tomb Raider had turned it into a publishing giant, agreed to market and publish the port. The PC version was announced in December 1997, along with Eidos's exclusivity deal for North America and Europe at the time, though the port was rumored to happen as early as December 1996, even prior to the PlayStation version's release. To help the product stand out in stores, Eidos chose a trapezoidal shape for the cover and box. They agreed on a contract price of $1.8 million, making initial sales forecasts of 100,000 units based on that outlay. The PC version was released in North America and Europe on June 25, 1998; the port was not released in Japan. Within one month, sales of the port exceeded the initial forecasts. The PC version would end up providing the source code for subsequent ports.

Localization

Localization of Final Fantasy VII was handled internally by Square. The English localization, led by Seth Luisi, was completed by a team of about fifty people who faced a variety of problems. According to Luisi, the biggest hurdle was making "the direct Japanese-to-English text translation read correctly in English. The sentence structure and grammar rules for the Japanese language is very different from English", making it difficult for the translation to read like native English without distorting the meaning. Michael Basket was the sole translator for the project, though he received the help of native Japanese speakers from the Tokyo office. The localization was taxing for the team due to their inexperience, lack of professional editors, and poor communication between the North American and Japanese offices. A result of this disconnect was the original localization of Aerith's name—which was intended as a conflation of "air" and "earth"—as "Aeris" due to a lack of communication between localization staff and the quality assurance team.

The team also faced several technical issues due to programming practices which took little account of subsequent localization, such as dealing with a fixed-width font and having to insert kanji through language input keys to add special characters (for example, vowels with diacritics) to keep the code working. Consequently, the text was still read as Japanese by the word processor, so the computer's spellcheck could not be used, and mistakes had to be caught manually. The code used obscure kanji to refer to main character's names, which made unintuitive for the translators to identify characters. Translated text usually takes up more space than the Japanese text, though still had to fit to the screen appropriately without overusing page breaksfor example, item names, which are written in kanji in Japanese language, could overflow message windows in translated text. To mitigate this problem, a proportional typeface was implemented into the source code to fit more text into the screen. Swear words were used frequently in the localization to help convey the original Japanese meaning, though most profanities were censored in a manner described by Square employee Richard Honeywood as the "old comic book '@#$%!'-type replacement". The European release was described as being in a worse condition, as the translations into multiple European languages were outsourced by Sony to another company, further hindering communication. For the PC port, Square attempted to fix translation and grammar mistakes for the North American and European versions but did not have the time and budget to retranslate all the text. According to Honeywood, the success of Final Fantasy VII in the West encouraged Square to focus more on localization quality; on future games, Square hired additional translators and editors, while also streamlining communication between the development and localization teams.

Some months prior to the game's North American release, Sony publicly stated that it was considering cutting the scene at the Honey Bee Inn due to the salacious content, prompting numerous online petitions and letters of protest from RPG fans. Square subsequently stated that it would never allow Sony to localize the game in any way. In addition to translating the text, the North American localization team made tweaks to the gameplay, including reducing the enemy encounter rate, simplifying the Materia menu, and adding new boss fights.

Later releases
The International version of Final Fantasy VII was released on PlayStation Network (PSN) as a PSOne Classic in Japan on April 10, 2009. This version was compatible with both PlayStation 3 and PlayStation Portable with support for PlayStation Vita and PlayStation TV coming later. Final Fantasy VII was later released as a PSOne Classic in North America, Europe, and Australia on June 2. The PC version was updated by DotEmu for use on modern operating systems and released via Square Enix's North American and European online stores on August 14, 2012. It included high-resolution support, cloud saves, achievements, and a character booster. It would later be released via Steam on July 4, 2013, replacing the version available on Square Enix's North American and European online stores. The PC version would be released in Japan for the first time on May 16, 2013, exclusively via Square Enix's Japanese online store with the International version title. It has features unavailable in the western version including high-speed mode, no random encounters mode, and a max stats command. A release for iOS, based on the PC version and adjusted for mobile devices by D4 Enterprise, was released on August 19, 2015, with an auto-save feature. The PC version was released for PlayStation 4 on December 5, 2015. DotEmu developed the PS4 version. A version for Android was released on July 7, 2016. A version for the PlayStation Classic was released on December 3, 2018. A version for the Nintendo Switch and Xbox One was released worldwide on March 26, 2019.

Reception

The game received universal acclaim from critics upon release, scoring 95% or higher in most publications at the time. It was referred to by GameFan as "quite possibly the greatest game ever made", a quote selected for the back cover of the game's jewel case. GameSpot commented that "never before have technology, playability, and narrative combined as well as in Final Fantasy VII", expressing particular favor toward the game's graphics, audio, and story. The four reviewers of Electronic Gaming Monthly unanimously gave it a 9.5 out of 10 and their "Game of the Month" award, lauding its rendered backgrounds, use of FMV, battles, and especially the story line, though they expressed disappointment that the ending didn't resolve all of the loose ends. They also considered the North American localization a dramatic improvement over the original Japanese version. GamePro gave it a perfect 5.0 out of 5 in all four categories (graphics, sound, control, and fun factor), calling the storytelling "dramatic, sentimental, and touching in a way that draws you into the characters", who "come alive thanks to sweetly subtle body movements". Both GamePro and Official U.S. PlayStation Magazine (OPM) said the ATB system gives battles a tension and urgency not usually seen in RPGs.

The game's visuals and use of FMV cutscenes were lauded by critics. IGNs Jay Boor insisted the game's graphics were "light years beyond anything ever seen on the PlayStation", and regarded its battle system as its strongest point. Critics also praised its gameplay and writing. In Computer and Video Games magazine, Paul Davies said the "thrilling" and "magnificent plot" would "rock your emotions" and "revolutionise your belief of what a video game can achieve" while Alex C praised the dramatic story and well-developed characters. In addition to calling the graphics "bar none the best the PlayStation has ever seen", Next Generation said of the story that "while FFVII may take a bit to get going, as in every entry in the series, moments of high melodrama are blended with scenes of sheer poetry and vision". Uematsu's soundtrack also attracted acclaim. Edge noted that Final Fantasy VII had come close to being an interactive movie in playable form, praising its combination of a complex story that went against Western graphic adventure trends and "excellently orchestrated chip music". RPGamer praised the game's soundtrack, both in variety and sheer volume, stating that "Uematsu has done his work exceptionally well" and saying that it was potentially his best work.

Digitiser praised the size of the game world, calling it the "largest video game" of all time, while considering the game "perfect in almost every respect". Dan Toose of Hyper magazine praised the "sub-games" or minigames, particularly the motorbike minigame which reminded him of the anime film Akira (1988).

Final Fantasy VII has also received some negative criticism. OPM and GameSpot questioned the game's linear progression. OPM considered the game's translation "a bit muddy" while RPGamer cited the game's translation as "packed with typos and other errors which further obscure what is already a very confusing plot". GamePro also considered the Japanese-to-English translation a significant weakness in the game, and IGN regarded the ability to use only three characters at a time as "the game's only shortcoming".

Reviewers gave similar praise to the PC version but criticized its various technical faults. Computer Games Magazine said that no other recent game had the same "tendency to fail to work in any capacity on multiple [computers]". Computer Gaming World complained that the music quality suffered on PC sound cards and Next Generation Magazine found the game's pre-rendered backgrounds significantly less impressive than those of the PlayStation version. However, Next Generation found the higher-resolution battle visuals "absolutely stunning", and Computer Games Magazine said that they showed off the potential graphical power of PCs. All three magazines concluded by praising the technically flawed game, and PC Gamer summarized that, while "Square apparently did only what was required to get its PlayStation game running under Windows, [Final Fantasy VII is] still a winner on the PC".

Sales
In the months leading up to the game's release, the game had a high level of anticipation. The Final Fantasy VII demo included with Tobal No. 1 helped push that game to the top of the Japanese sales charts, selling 752,000 copies to become Japan's eighth best-selling video game of 1996. In the weeks leading up to the release of Final Fantasy VII in January 1997, PlayStation consoles had sold out across Japan. The game had over  pre-orders about ten days before release, increasing to  pre-sales shortly before release. Within three days of release,  copies were sold, setting the record for the fastest-selling game ever at the time. It was a killer app for the PlayStation, with Computing Japan magazine noting that it was largely responsible for the PlayStation's global installed base increasing from 10 million units sold by November 1996 to 16 million units sold by May 1997 (an increase of 60%). The game helped push PlayStation sales ahead of the Sega Saturn in Japan, after the PlayStation and Saturn had been very close in Japan prior to the game's release.

In North America, it was the most anticipated game at the time, with its popularity inspiring thousands of retailers to break street dates in September to meet public demand for the game. In the game's debut weekend in North America, more than 330,000 copies were sold and  grossed ( adjusted for inflation), which was higher than any video game (surpassing Star Fox 64 at 300,000 sales) and most Hollywood blockbuster movies to date. Final Fantasy VII reportedly went on to sell  copies in North America during its first week of release. It helped the PlayStation break a long spell of Nintendo 64 dominance in North America; the game topped the monthly sales chart and entered the top three on the video game rental chart, the first time a PlayStation title entered the top five after months of Nintendo 64 games dominating the rental charts. Business analyst Edward Williams (from Monness, Crespi, Hardt & Co.) commented that "Sony redefined the role-playing game (RPG) category and expanded the conventional audience with the launch of Final Fantasy VII". It held the North American opening weekend sales record up until Resident Evil 2 (1998), and it was the highest-grossing Final Fantasy game in North America until Final Fantasy XV (2016). It also topped the UK sales charts. In Germany, it received a Gold award from the Verband der Unterhaltungssoftware Deutschland (VUD) in August 1998 for sales above 100,000 copies.

Worldwide, it was the best-selling video game of 1997. It sold more than  copies by 1998, becoming the best-selling PlayStation game up until then. This made it the highest-selling Final Fantasy game and the best-selling Square Enix title. By the end of 2005, 9.8 million copies had been sold worldwide, including 4 million sales in Japan and 5.8million sales abroad in North America and Europe. In 2006, 158,458 copies of The Bests bargain reissue of the game had been sold in Japan, and 63,770 units of the 2006 Ultimate Hits release were sold in Japan by 2007, bringing total sales of the PlayStation version to more than 10 million copies worldwide.

More than 100,000 downloads were sold of the PSN version during its first week of release in 2009. By August 2015, more than 11 million units of the PlayStation and PC versions had been sold worldwide. Steam Spy estimated more than 1.2 million downloads on Steam as of April 2018, with a later Steam leak estimating it had 1.14 million players on the platform as of July 2018. Google Play has had more than 100,000 downloads. By 2019, more than 12.3 million units had been sold across all platforms. As of June 2020, the game has sold more than 13.3 million units worldwide. As of March 2022, the game has topped 13.9 million units worldwide. As of January 2023, the game has sold over 14.1 million units to date.

Awards
Final Fantasy VII was given numerous Game of the Year awards in 1997. At the second CESA Awards, it won the Grand Prize, Scenario Award and Sound Award. During the Academy of Interactive Arts & Sciences's first annual Interactive Achievement Awards (now known as the D.I.C.E. Awards), Final Fantasy VII won in the categories of "Console Adventure Game of the Year" and "Console Role Playing Game of the Year", and was nominated for "Interactive Title of the Year", "Outstanding Achievement in Art/Graphics", and "Outstanding Achievement in Interactive Design". In the Origins Awards, it won in the category "Best Roleplaying Computer Game of 1997". Final Fantasy VII was awarded Game of the Year by magazines including Game Informer, GamePro, and Hyper. It was also awarded the "Readers' Choice All Systems Game of the Year", "Readers' Choice PlayStation Game of the Year" and "Readers' Choice Role-Playing Game of the Year" by Electronic Gaming Monthly (EGM), which gave it Editors' Choice Awards for "Role-Playing Game of the Year" and "Best Graphics" (plus a runner-up slot for "Game of the Year"), and also gave it awards for "Hottest Video Game Babe" (for Tifa Lockhart), "Most Hype for a Game", "Best Ending", and "Best Print Ad". Digitiser ranked it the second best game of 1997 (after Super Mario 64) and RPGFan awarded it Best Overall RPG.

Retrospective

Since 1997, Final Fantasy VII has been selected by many game magazines as one of the top video games of all time, listed as 21st in EGMs "100 Best Games of All Time" the same year it was released, 91st in EGMs 2001 "100 Best Games of All Time", tenth in Game Informers 2001 "Top 100 Games of All Time" list, and as fourth in Retro Gamers "Top 100 Games" in 2004. Final Fantasy VII was included in "The Greatest Games of All Time" list by GameSpot in 2006, and ranked as second in Empire 2006 "100 Greatest Games of All Time", 76th in IGN 2007 "Top 100 Games of All Time" list, as third in Stuffs "100 Greatest Games" in 2008, and as 15th in Game Informers 2009 "Top 200 Games of All Time" list. In 2012, Time named it one of their "All-Time 100 Video Games". In 2018, it was ranked 99th in IGN "Top 100 Games of All Time" and as third in PALGNs "The Greatest 100 Games Ever". In 2019, Popular Mechanics ranked it he second best game of all time.

Final Fantasy VII has often placed at or near the top of many reader polls of all-time best games. In 1997, it placed 9th in EGMs readers' top 10 games of all time, which the publication noted was startling because the game had not been released in the United States (where EGM was published) at the time of voting. It was voted the "Reader's Choice Game of the Century" in an IGN poll for PlayStation games in 2000, and placed second in the "Top 100 Favorite Games of All Time" by Japanese magazine Famitsu in 2006 (it was also voted as ninth in Famitsu 2011 poll of most tear-inducing games of all time). Users of GameFAQs voted it the "Best Game Ever" in 2004 and in 2005, and placed it second in 2009. In 2008, readers of Dengeki magazine voted it the best game ever made, as well as the ninth most tear-inducing game of all time. In March 2018, Game Informers "Reader's Choice Top 300 Games of All Time", it ranked in 7th place. In a 2021 poll conducted by TV Asahi, polling over 50,000 Japanese users, it was voted the third best console game of all time, below The Legend of Zelda: Breath of the Wild and Dragon Quest V.

It has also appeared in numerous other greatest game lists. In 2007, Dengeki PlayStation gave it the "Best Story", "Best RPG" and "Best Overall Game" retrospective awards for games on the original PlayStation. GamePro named it the best RPG game of all time in 2008, and featured it in its 2010 article "The 30 Best PSN Games". In 2012, GamesRadar also ranked it as the sixth saddest game ever. In March 2018, GamesRadar+ rated "The 25 best PS1 games of all time", Final Fantasy VII was ranked in 12th place. On the other hand, GameSpy ranked it seventh on their 2003 list of the most overrated games. In 2023, Time Extension included the game on their "Best JRPGs of All Time" list.

Legacy
The game inspired an unofficial version for the NES by Chinese company Shenzhen Nanjing Technology. This port features the Final Fantasy VII game scaled back to 2D, with some of the side quests removed. The game's popularity and open-ended nature also led director Kitase and scenario writer Nojima to establish a plot-related connection between Final Fantasy VII and Final Fantasy X-2. The character Shinra from Final Fantasy X-2 proposes the concept of extracting the life energy from within the planet Spira. Nojima has stated that Shinra and his proposal are a deliberate nod to the Shinra Company and that he envisioned the events of X-2 as a prequel to those in Final Fantasy VII. The advances in technology used to create the FMV sequences and computer graphics for Final Fantasy VII allowed Sakaguchi to begin production on the first Final Fantasy film, Final Fantasy: The Spirits Within. The game introduced a particular aesthetic to the series—fantasy suffused with modern-to-advanced technology—that was explored further in Final Fantasy VIII, The Spirits Within, and XV. Re-releases of Square games in Japan with bonus features would occur frequently after the release of Final Fantasy VII International. Later games that would be re-released as international versions include Final Fantasy X and other follow-ups from the franchise, as well as the Kingdom Hearts series.

Several characters from Final Fantasy VII have made cameo appearances in other Square Enix games, such as the fighting game Ehrgeiz and the popular Final-Fantasy-to-Disney crossover series Kingdom Hearts. Additionally, fighting video game Dissidia Final Fantasy includes Final Fantasy VII characters such as Cloud and Sephiroth, and allows players to fight with characters from throughout the Final Fantasy series, and its follow-up, Dissidia 012, included Tifa as well. Cloud is also a playable character in Final Fantasy Tactics. In December 2015, Cloud was released as a downloadable content character for the Nintendo crossover fighting games Super Smash Bros. for Nintendo 3DS and Wii U, along with a stage based on Midgar. He returned in the 2018 sequel, Super Smash Bros. Ultimate. Sephiroth was added to Ultimate as downloadable content in December 2020 as part of the  Fighters Pass Vol. 2 lineup, alongside 9 additional music tracks from Final Fantasy VII, three additional Mii Costumes based on Aerith, Barret and Tifa, thirteen new Spirits themed around Final Fantasy, and a new stage based on the Northern Cave, the final area in the original game. On television, Final Fantasy VII was parodied in the second season of Robot Chicken in 2006.

Impact

Final Fantasy VII is credited as having the largest impact of the Final Fantasy series. In 2002, GameSpot ranked it as the second most influential game ever made. In 2005, Electronic Gaming Monthly ranked it the 6th most important game since they began publication in 1989, stating it was "the first RPG to surpass, instead of copy, movielike storytelling" and taught gamers "how to cry". In 2007, GamePro ranked it 14th on their list of the most important games of all time, and in 2009 it was ranked the same place on their list of the most influential and innovative games of all time. Bill Loguidice and Matt Barton listed Final Fantasy VII among the 25 most influential games of all time. Samuel Roberts of Retro Gamer, writing for GamesRadar, called FFVII "one of the most important and influential RPGs of all time" in January 2020. IGN said the game "revolutionised" role-playing games. In 2018, The Strong National Museum of Play inducted Final Fantasy VII to its World Video Game Hall of Fame.

The game is credited with allowing console role-playing games to gain mass-market appeal outside of Japan. Role-playing video games were a niche genre in North America up until Final Fantasy VII introduced the genre to a mainstream audience there, and it is the first main-line Final Fantasy game to have been released in Europe, where its success generated mainstream interest in RPGs. It popularized Japanese role-playing games outside of Japan, in addition to opening up the game console market for Western computer role-playing game developers such as BioWare. According to Gene Park of The Washington Post, FFVII "single-handedly put role-playing video games on the global map". It also boosted sales of the original PlayStation, and demonstrated the advantages of CD-ROM media over ROM cartridge media. According to Sony Computer Entertainment founder and PlayStation architect Ken Kutaragi, FFVII was "a driving force that propelled gaming forward" along with the PlayStation, and the game contributed to growing global awareness of Japanese popular culture along with anime. According to Matt Alt, FFVII injected "a megadose of Japanese sensibilities" into the American mainstream, including "big-eyed bushy-haired anime" characters, manga-style melodrama, "androgynous heroes" and "the very idea that video games could be meditative explorations as well as thrill rides".

FFVII was one of the first video games produced at a blockbuster (AAA) scale. It was the most expensive video game ever developed up until then, and its expensive advertisement campaign was also unprecedented for a video game. It set a benchmark for video game graphics, full motion video, cinematic CGI production values, and movie-like presentation, along with its innovative blend of gameplay with dynamic cinematic camerawork. It also set a benchmark for orchestral video game music, with "Aerith's Theme" appearing on the Classic FM Hall of Fame at 16th place in 2012, and with Elizabeth Davis of Classic FM (UK) calling it "one of the most famous pieces of video game music ever written" and stating that FFVII helped introduce "a whole generation to the magic of orchestral music". The large number of minigames was also unprecedented for a role-playing game, inspiring numerous later titles to incorporate minigames.

The game's storytelling was considered revelatory for its time and resonated with most of its audience. The depth of its storytelling, along with its character building, emotional scenes, and cinematic production values, made it a landmark for video game storytelling. Aerith's death in particular has often been referred to as one of the most significant moments from any video game. It is one of the most iconic deaths in video game history, is frequently cited as one of gaming's most shocking and emotional scenes, and cemented Sephiroth's status as one of the most infamous video game villains. The scene topped IGNs list of top 100 video game moments, calling it "a genre-defining moment" and representative of "gaming's emotional journey from kids' entertainment to modern storytelling medium". Brian Taylor, writing for Kill Screen, described a cottage industry of fan theories for how to return Aerith to life or prevent her death. He compared these efforts to the letter-writing campaign to convince Charles Dickens not to let Nell, the endearing protagonist of The Old Curiosity Shop, die at the end of the book. Taylor affirmed that the acts of discussing these fan theories and dissecting the game code to test them comprise a valid and important part of the experience of the game.

The game has inspired numerous developers. GameSpot stated that Final Fantasy VII was "the RPG that would influence every role-playing game that would follow" after it, and that its cinematic approach to storytelling was widely adopted by later RPGs. Its Limit Break gameplay mechanic became a core mechanic in subsequent Final Fantasy games. According to Samuel Roberts of Retro Gamer, the game's "character designs would shape Japanese RPGs for years to come". Fable creator Peter Molyneux considers FFVII to be the RPG that "defined the genre" for him. BioWare founder Greg Zeschuk cited FFVII as "the first really emotionally engaging game" he played and said it had "a big impact" on BioWare's work. Black Isle Studios cited FFVII as an inspiration for Planescape: Torment (1999). According to Maciej Miszczyk of Hardcore Gaming 101, FFVIIs spell animations and character quests may have influenced Western computer RPGs such as Planescape: Torment and BioWare's Baldur's Gate II (2000). Media Molecule's Constantin Jupp credited FFVII with getting him into game design. Tim Schafer cited FFVII as one of his favorite games of all time. Thatgamecompany founder Jenova Chen cited FFVII as one of the biggest influences on his work and the game that inspired his adopted name (from the character Jenova). Grinding Gear Games designer Chris Wilson cited the Materia system of FFVII as an influence on Path of Exile (2013).

Themes
The game is noted for its cyberpunk themes, with GamesRadar+ calling it one of the best games of the genre, and Harry Mackin of Paste Magazine comparing its cyberpunk city of Midgar to Akira and Blade Runner. Aja Romano of The Daily Dot and Philip Boyes of Eurogamer cited Final Fantasy VII as an example of dieselpunk, a genre similar to steampunk. According to Comic Book Resources, the game's environmental and climate change themes are more relevant and meaningful in 2019 than they were in 1997. William Hughes of The A.V. Club notes that Barret and his terrorist cell AVALANCHE are one of the few examples of "heroic pop culture terrorists" in video games, and that the game's "political relevance remains" in a post-9/11 world. Dani Di Placido of Forbes said the game was still relevant in 2020, drawing parallels between the game's events and contemporary issues such as climate change, environmental catastrophe, economic collapse, and the COVID-19 pandemic (comparing the latter to the game world after Meteor is summoned). According to Stephen K. Hirst of Ars Technica, Final Fantasy VII inspired a generation of climate activists, including senior members of Greenpeace. Murray Clark of Esquire argues that several characters wore clothing which anticipated several contemporary fashion trends.

Final Fantasy VII is noted for its use of the unreliable narrator literary concept, drawing comparisons to later films such as Fight Club (1999), The Sixth Sense (1999), American Psycho (2000) and Memento (2000). Patrick Holleman and Jeremy Parish argue that the game takes the unreliable narrator concept a step further, with its interactivity establishing a connection between the player and the protagonist Cloud, setting FFVII apart from films as well as other video games. According to Holleman, "no RPG has ever deliberately betrayed the connection between protagonist and player like FFVII does". Ric Manning of The Courier-Journal noted elements of psychoanalysis in the game. Sharon Packer identifies Cloud as having mental illness in the form of dissociative identity disorder (DID), while Katie Whitlock identifies him as having involuntary memory resulting from post-traumatic stress disorder (PTSD). Harry Mackin of Paste Magazine called the game "a subversion that deconstructs and comments meaningfully on how we think about heroism, masculinity and identity in videogame storytelling". Jack Ridsdale of PCGamesN argues that Cloud is a deconstruction of the hero archetype and toxic masculinity, and compares the plot twist about his true identity to that of Fight Club. According to Gene Park of The Washington Post, with its "cyberpunk story about personal delusions, mental illness, climate change and class warfare, it was Blade Runner for millennials".

Pat Holleman's book Reverse Design: Final Fantasy VII (2018) examines the game's themes and topics in detail. He summarizes the game's plot as telling "a story about survivors". He explains that it is "a story about characters who have outlived the people, places, and things that gave them their identities" and that most of the characters are "motivated by the loss of something that once defined who they are". He notes that nearly all the major characters exhibit the "survivor's trio" which consists of losing "the world that defined" them, a "near-death experience" and "something that connects" them to their past. He also notes that the game is, "at times, a deconstruction of a revenge story" in the sense that it "dismantles the idea of revenge in an insightful way". He considers Barret's story to be the clearest illustration of the "tragic survivorship" and "survivor's trio" themes, such as the loss of his coal mining hometown, seeking revenge through militant environmentalism before eventually realizing revenge isn't the right motivation, and safeguarding a future for his adoptive daughter Marlene who is the only surviving connection to his past. He also considers the Limit Break mechanic to be a gameplay representation of the survivorship theme. He argues that these are themes which only adults can fully relate to, and were misunderstood by much of the game's predominantly adolescent audience upon release. Jessica Howard of GameSpot says that relationships, motherhood, politics and identity are central themes in Final Fantasy VII, and that it is "an extremely punk game, abundant with political sentiments and messages regarding the distribution of power, our treatment of the environment, and the evil found in complicity".

Compilation of Final Fantasy VII

The world of Final Fantasy VII is explored further in the Compilation of Final Fantasy VII, a series of games, animated features, and short stories. The first game in the Compilation is the mobile game Before Crisis: Final Fantasy VII, a prequel focusing on the Turks' activities six years before the original game. The CGI film sequel Final Fantasy VII: Advent Children, set two years after the game, is the first installment announced but the second to be released. Special DVD editions of the film included Last Order: Final Fantasy VII, an original video animation that recounts the destruction of Nibelheim. Dirge of Cerberus: Final Fantasy VII and its mobile phone counterpart, Dirge of Cerberus Lost Episode: Final Fantasy VII, are third-person shooters set one year after Advent Children. Dirge focuses on the backstory of Vincent Valentine, whose history was left mostly untold in Final Fantasy VII. The next game is the PlayStation Portable game Crisis Core: Final Fantasy VII, an action role-playing game that centers on Zack's past that takes place seven years before the original game.

Related media and merchandise
During the game's initial marketing campaign in early 1997, numerous merchandise related to Final Fantasy VII were produced in Japan. There were various different types of toys produced, including novelty egg dispensers, pin badges, action figures, video game music CDs, and guide books. Sega's UFO Catcher arcade crane machines also contained Final Fantasy VII character keyrings and toys. In 1997, Studio BentStuff wrote the game guide book Final Fantasy VII Kaitai Shinsho, which sold over  copies. In 1998, the Official Final Fantasy VII Strategy Guide was licensed by Square Soft and published by Brady Games.

Releases not under the Compilation label include Maiden Who Travels the Planet, which follows Aerith's journey in the Lifestream after her death, taking place concurrently with the second half of the original game.

Final Fantasy VII Snowboarding is a mobile port of the snowboard minigame featured in the original game, featuring different courses for the player to tackle. The game is downloadable on V Cast-compatible mobile phones and was first made available in 2005 in Japan and North America. In September 2009 Jason P. Blahuta, Michel S. Beaulieu Wiley created "Final Fantasy and Philosophy: The Ultimate Walkthrough". This eBook is a philosophical guide as to why and how players use certain characters in the Final Fantasy series, explains how gamer's perception of a character's weapon and clothing designs can change how they use them. The writers inform the reader that this eBook will give them an in-depth understanding of themselves and the game which will enhance their gaming experience.

Final Fantasy VII G-Bike is a mobile game released for iOS and Android in December 2014, based on the motorbike minigame featured in the original game. In September 2007, Square Enix published Final Fantasy VII 10th Anniversary Ultimania. This book is an in-depth compilation of FFVII story-line and artwork. In 2018, the Universal Studios Theme Park in Japan changed their Space Fantasy roller coaster into a virtual reality ride based around Final Fantasy with characters from Final Fantasy VII.

Final Fantasy VII is featured in the Final Fantasy Trading Card Game, making an appearance in its first Opus I set. Final Fantasy VII has made additional appearances in opuses II, III, IV, VI, VII, VIII, IX, X, XI, XII, XIII, and XIV.

Final Fantasy VII Remake

With the announcement and development of the Compilation of Final Fantasy VII, speculation spread that a remake of the original Final Fantasy VII would be released for the PlayStation 3. This conjecture was sparked by the release of a video featuring the opening sequence of FFVII recreated using the PlayStation 3's graphical capabilities at E3 2005. After a decade of speculation, a remake was announced at E3 2015. The game saw changes made to its story and combat system. The game is planned to be released over three installments, with the first part being released for the PlayStation 4 on April 10, 2020. The follow up, Final Fantasy VII Rebirth, is set to be released Q4 2023/Q1 2024. Crisis Core: Final Fantasy VII Reunion, a remaster of Crisis Core: Final Fantasy VII, which was released in December 2022, is also considered a prequel to the larger Final Fantasy VII Remake project.

Notes

Further reading

References

External links

 

 
1997 video games
Android (operating system) games
Cancelled Nintendo 64 games
Cancelled Super Nintendo Entertainment System games
Climate change in fiction
Cyberpunk video games
Dieselpunk video games
Dissociative identity disorder in video games
Dystopian video games
Eco-terrorism in fiction
Eidos Interactive games
Environmental mass media
Fiction with unreliable narrators
Final Fantasy video games
Video games about impact events
IOS games
Interactive Achievement Award winners
Nintendo Switch games
Origins Award winners
PlayStation (console) games
PlayStation 4 games
PlayStation Network games
Post-traumatic stress disorder in fiction
Role-playing video games
Science fantasy video games
Single-player video games
Sony Interactive Entertainment games
Terrorism in fiction
Urban fantasy video games
Video games about amnesia
Video games about genetic engineering
Video games about mental health
Video games adapted into films
Video games developed in Japan
Video games scored by Nobuo Uematsu
Video games set on fictional planets
Video games with pre-rendered 3D graphics
Windows games
Works about psychoanalysis
Xbox One games
Japan Game Awards' Game of the Year winners
World Video Game Hall of Fame
D.I.C.E. Award for Role-Playing Game of the Year winners